Desulfobacula phenolica is a bacterium species in the genus Desulfobacula.

The specific epithet is from New Latin noun phenol -olis, phenol; Latin feminine gender suff. -ica, suffix used with the sense of pertaining to; New Latin feminine gender adjective phenolica, pertaining to phenol.)

References

External links 
Type strain of Desulfobacula phenolica at BacDive -  the Bacterial Diversity Metadatabase

Desulfobacterales
Bacteria described in 2001